In Mandaeism, riha is incense used for religious rituals. It is offered on stands called kinta by Mandaean priests in order to establish laufa (communion) between humans in Tibil (Earth) and uthras (celestial beings) in the World of Light during rituals such as the masbuta (baptism) and masiqta (death mass), as well as during priest initiation ceremonies. Various prayers in the Qolasta are recited when incense is offered. Incense must be offered during specific stages of the typically lengthy and complex rituals.

In the Qolasta

Several prayers in the Qolasta are recited when offering incense, including prayers 8 and 34.

See also
 Incense offering in Judaism
 Incense offering in rabbinic literature
 Kyphi in Ancient Egypt
 Religious use of incense

References

Mandaic words and phrases
Incense
Mandaean religious objects